Catamelas is a monotypic moth genus of the family Erebidae erected by Alois Friedrich Rogenhofer in 1874. Its only species, Catamelas caripina, was first described by Felder in 1874. It is found in Brazil.

References

Calpinae
Monotypic moth genera